Jonathan Cantwell (8 January 1982 – 6 November 2018) was an Australian professional road bicycle racer, who rode professionally between 2008 and 2014 for the Jittery Joe's,  and  teams.

During his career, Cantwell won a stage of the Herald Sun Tour, and two stages of the Tour de Taiwan. In 2011, he won the Australian National Criterium Championships.

Career
Cantwell joined  for the 2012 season. Cantwell made his Grand Tour début at the 2012 Tour de France, where he was earmarked as a lead-out man for the team's sprinter, Juan José Haedo; Cantwell took his first top ten placing on stage 4, when he finished sixth on the stage. He finished 137th overall in the Tour.

Cantwell left  at the end of the 2013 season, and joined  for the 2014 season.

At the end of the 2014 season, Cantwell retired from professional cycling, in order to take up duathlon and triathlon. He competed at the 2017 ITU World Triathlon Series.

Illness and death
In 2017, Cantwell revealed that he had undergone an operation for testicular cancer. He died on 7 November 2018 at the age of 36; the cause was suicide (mental illness-related suicide had also claimed the lives of his father and brother). Cantwell had two children.

Major results
Source:

2007
 Tour of Virginia
1st Stages 4 & 5
 3rd Overall International Cycling Classic
2008
 1st Overall Tour of Murrieta
1st Stage 1
 1st Overall International Cycling Classic
2009
 1st Overall Tour of the Murray River
1st Stages 1, 3 & 7
 1st Overall Tour of Atlanta
1st Stages 1, 2 & 3
 Tour of Tasmania
1st Stages 1, 3 & 10
 1st Stage 3 Tour of Elk Grove
 1st Stage 3 San Dimas Stage Race
 2nd Overall Tour of Murrieta
1st Stage 2
 2nd Overall Tulsa Tough
 2nd Goulburn–Sydney
 3rd Overall Herald Sun Tour
1st Stage 6
 3rd Overall International Cycling Classic
1st Stage 17
 5th Overall Tour of Geelong
1st Stage 1
2010
 1st Overall International Cycling Classic
1st Stages 7, 10, 12, 15, 16 & 17
 1st Overall Tour of Elk Grove
1st Stages 2 & 3
 1st Goulburn to Sydney Classic
 1st Stage 3 Joe Martin Stage Race
 2nd Overall USA Cycling National Racing Calendar
 2nd Overall Tour of Murrieta
1st Stage 2
 2nd Overall Tulsa Tough
 3rd Overall 2009–10 UCI Oceania Tour
 9th Tour of the Battenkill
2011
 1st  National Criterium Championships
 Tour of the Murray River
1st Stages 1, 9 & 10
 3rd Overall Tulsa Tough
1st Stage 1
 4th Overall USA Cycling National Racing Calendar
 5th Overall Tour of America's Dairyland
1st Stage 5
 10th Overall Tour of Elk Grove
2012
 Tour de Taiwan
1st Stages 4 & 7
 5th Grand Prix de Fourmies
 7th Trofeo Migjorn
 8th Overall World Ports Classic
2013
 2nd Overall World Ports Classic
 4th Kampioenschap van Vlaanderen
2014
 6th Overall Herald Sun Tour
2015
 10th Overall Bay Classic Series

References

External links

Saxo Bank-Tinkoff Bank profile

1982 births
2018 deaths
Australian male cyclists
Place of birth missing
Place of death missing
Suicides in Australia
2018 suicides